Blaengwawr  was, for much of the twentieth century, an electoral ward for the purposes of electing members to Glamorgan County Council and the Aberdare Urban District Council. Blaengwawr no longer forms an electoral ward and is part of Aberaman.

Gadlys first became an electoral ward in the late nineteenth century with the formation of Glamorgan County Council. Gadlys was also one of the five electoral wards of the Aberdare Urban District Council from its formation in 1894. The other wards were Aberaman, Aberdare Town, Gadlys and Llwydcoed.

History 1889-1914
Blaengwawr first became an electoral ward in the late nineteenth century with the formation of Aberdare Urban District Council. From 1895, Blaengwawr was also an electoral ward for the purposes of elections to Glamorgan County Council following reorganisation of wards in the Aberdare area.

Glamorgan County Council
In 1895, John Howell, who was already a district councillor, became the first member to represent the ward.

Howell was again elected unopposed in 1898

In 1901, Howell appears to have been again returned without opposition although the result cannot be traced.

At the 1904 election, Howell was opposed by another Liberal candidate, Gwilym Treharne, who came within 71 votes of victory.

Treharne intended to oppose Howell again in 1907 but withdrew before the poll.

In 1910, however, Treharne finally succeeded in ousting Howell, who lost his seat after fifteen years.

It can be seen, therefore, that Labour made no challenge for this seat at county level. The position in district election was, however, a different one.

Aberdare Urban District Council
Blaengwawr was also an electoral ward of the Aberdare Urban District Council from its formation in 1894.

In 1899, John Howell was again returned unopposed.

In 1900, David Price Davies was returned without opposition.

In 1901, Llewellyn was re-elected by a large majority.

The 1902 result cannot be traced but in 1903,  J.W. Evans was re-elected unopposed.

In 1904 an additional seat was created, allowing T. Walter Williams to be returned alongside Rees Llewellyn.

References

Wards of Rhondda Cynon Taf